At Home With The Eubanks was a short-lived reality show starring British boxer Chris Eubank and his family which was broadcast on Channel Five.

References

2003 British television series debuts
2003 British television series endings
English-language television shows
Channel 5 (British TV channel) reality television shows
Carlton Television
Television series by ITV Studios
British reality television series